This is a timeline documenting jazz events in the year 2016.

Albums released

January

February

March

April

May

June

July

August

September

October

November

December

Unknown date
#

A
 Quiet Revolution (Newvelle) by Ben Allison solo piano (vinyl LP).

D
 Return (Newvelle) by Jack DeJohnette solo piano (vinyl LP).

F
 Strength and Sanity (Newvelle) by Don Friedman Piano Trio (vinyl LP).

K
 Meantime (Newvelle) by Frank Kimbrough (vinyl LP).

P
 Some Other Time (Newvelle) by Noah Preminger (vinyl LP).

Deaths

January 
 3 – Paul Bley, Canadian pianist (born 1932).
 4 – Long John Hunter, American guitarist and singer-songwriter (born 1931).
 6 – Alfredo "Chocolate" Armenteros, Cuban trumpeter(born 1928).
 7 – Alan Haven, English organist (born 1935).
 16 – Hubert Giraud, French composer and lyricist (born 1920).
 31 – Janusz Muniak, Polish saxophonist, flautist, arranger, and composer (born 1941).

February 
 4 – Maurice White, American singer-songwriter, musician, record producer, and bandleader, Earth, Wind & Fire (born 1941).
 19 – Harald Devold, Norwegian saxophonist (cancer) (born 1964.
 25 – John Chilton, British trumpeter and writer (born 1932).

March 
 9 – Naná Vasconcelos, Brazilian percussionist (born 1944).
 10
 Ernestine Anderson, American jazz and blues singer (born 1928).
 Keith Emerson, English pianist and keyboardist (suicide), Emerson, Lake & Palmer (born 1944).
 11 – Joe Ascione, American drummer (born 1961).
 15 – Ryo Fukui, Japanese pianist (born 1948).
 16 – Frank Sinatra Jr., American singer, songwriter, and conductor (born 1944).
 22 – Selçuk Sun, Turkish upright bassist and composer (born 1934).
 24 – Roger Cicero, German singer and songwriter (born 1970).
 26 – David Baker, American symphonic jazz composer (born 1931).

April 
 2 – Gato Barbieri, Argentine saxophonist (born 1932).
 3
 Bill Henderson, American singer and actor (born 1926).
Don Francks, Canadian singer and actor (born 1932).
 4 – Getatchew Mekurya, Ethiopian saxophonist (born 1935).
 5 – Zena Latto, American clarinetist and saxophonist (born 1925).
 6 – Dennis Davis, American drummer (cancer) (born 1949).
 13
 Jeremy Steig, American flautist (born 1942).
 Mariano Mores, Argentine tango composer and pianist (born 1918).
 Pete Yellin, American saxophonist and educator (born 1941).
 21 – Prince Rogers Nelson, American singer-songwriter, multi-instrumentalist, and record producer (born 1958).
 24
 Billy Paul, Congolese singer and musician (born 1934).
 Papa Wemba, American soul singer (born 1949).

May 
 1 – Doug Raney, American guitarist (born 1956).
 6
 Candye Kane, American singer and entertainer (pancreatic cancer) (born 1961).
 Johannes Bauer, German trombonist (born 1954).
 11 – Joe Temperley, Scottish saxophonist (born 1929).
 13 – Buster Cooper, American trombonist (born 1929).
 16 – Fredrik Norén, Swedish drummer and band leader (born 1941).

June 
 8 – Terje Fjærn, orchestra conductor ("La det swinge") (born 1942).
 16 – Charles Thompson, American swing and bebop pianist, and organist, composer (born 1918).
 17 – Willy Andresen, Norwegian pianist and band leader (born 1921).
 21 – Pat Friday, American singer (born 1921).
 23 – Shelley Moore, English-born American singer (born 1932).
 24 – Bernie Worrell, American keyboarder and composer, Parliament-Funkadelic (born 1944).
 26 – Mike Pedicin, American saxophonist and bandleader (born 1917).
 30 – Don Friedman, American pianist (born 1935).

July 

 15
 Charles Davis, American saxophonist and composer (born 1933).
 Roland Prince, Antiguan guitarist (born 1946).
 16 – Claude Williamson, American pianist (born 1926).
 167 – Peter Appleyard, British–Canadian vibraphonist, percussionist, and composer (born 1928).
 22 – Dominic Duval, American free jazz bassist (born 1944).
 31 – Jon Klette, Norwegian saxophonist (born 1962).

August 
 5 – David Attwooll, British drummer, poet, and publisher, Henry Cow (born 1949).
 6 – Pete Fountain, American clarinetist (born 1930).
 13 – Connie Crothers, American pianist (cancer) (born 1941).
 15 – Bobby Hutcherson, American vibraphone and marimba player (born 1941).
 17 – John Fischer, American pianist, composer, and visual artist (born 1930).
 18 – Fred Nøddelund, Norwegian flugelhornist and band leader (born 1947).
 19
 Derek Smith, British pianist (born 1931).
 Horacio Salgán, Argentine tango pianist (born 1916).
 20
 Irving Fields, American pianist and lounge music artist(born 1915).
 Louis Stewart, American guitarist (born 1944).
 22 – Toots Thielemans, Belgian and American harmonica player and guitarist (born 1922).
 25 – Rudy Van Gelder, American recording engineer (born 1924).
 29 – Michael Di Pasqua, American drummer and percussionist (cancer) (born 1953).

September 
 24 – Buckwheat Zydeco, American accordionist and zydeco musician (lung cancer) (born 1947).
 26 – Karel Růžička, Czech jazz pianist, composer, and music teacher (born 1940).

October 
 2 – Steve Byrd, English guitarist, Gillan and Kim Wilde (heart attack) (born 1955).
 13 – Bhumibol Adulyadej, Thai monarch and saxophonist (born 1927).
 18 – Mike Daniels, British trumpeter and bandleader (born 1928).
 24 – Shirley Bunnie Foy, American singer, songwriter, and percussionist (born 1936).
 27 – Bobby Wellins, Scottish tenor saxophonist (born 1936).

November 
 1 – Pocho La Pantera, Argentine cumbia singer (born 1950).
 2 – Bob Cranshaw, American bassist (born 1932).
 3 – Kay Starr, American singer (complications of Alzheimer's disease) (born 1922).
 9 – Al Caiola, American guitarist, composer, and arranger (born 1920).
 11 – Victor Bailey, American bass guitarist (born 1960).
 12 – Guilherme Franco, Brazilian percussionist (born 1946).
 13 – Leon Russell, American musician and songwriter (born 1942).
 15 – Mose Allison, American pianist and singer (born 1927).
 20 – Hod O'Brien, American pianist (born 1936).
 24 – Chuck Flores, American drummer (born 1935).
 28 – Carlton Kitto, Indian guitarist (born 1942).
 30 – Ivar Thomassen, Norwegian folk singer, songwriter, and jazz pianist (born 1954).

December 
 6
 Alonzo Levister, American composer, arranger, music producer, and pianist (born 1925).
 Michael White, American violinist (born 1933).
 7 – Greg Lake, English guitarist, bassist, singer, songwriter, and music producer (born 1947).
 15 – Dave Shepherd, English clarinetist (born 1929).
 18 – Léo Marjane, French singer (born 1912).
 21 – Betty Loo Taylor, Hawaii-American pianist (born 1929).
 23 – Carlos Averhoff, Cuban tenor saxophonist (born 1947).
 26 – Alphonse Mouzon, American drummer and the owner of Tenacious Records (born 1948).
 28 – Knut Kiesewetter, German trombonist, singer, songwriter, and producer (born 1941).

See also

 List of 2016 albums
 List of years in jazz
 2010s in jazz
 2016 in music

References 

2010s in jazz
Jazz